Bahrām is a male given name. Other variants Behram, Bahran, Vahran, and Vahram ( and Tajik: Баҳром, Bahrom)

The older form is Vahrām (in ), also spelled Wahrām, literally meaning "smiting of resistance" or "victorious". It is name of several prominent figures in pre-Islamic Persia.

In the Pahlavi language (Middle Persian), Bahram is another name of the Zoroastrian divinity Verethragna in Avestan language, that is the hypostasis of victory and represents the planet Mars.

Historic people
 One of the Sassanid kings by that name: 
 Bahrām I, r. 273-276
 Bahrām II, r. 276-293
 Bahrām III, r. 293
 Ardashir II, r. 379–383, who also went by the name 'Ardashir Vahram'
 Bahrām IV, r. 388–399
 Bahrām V Gōr, r. 421–438 (often known as Bahram Gur)
 Bahrām VI Čōbīn, r. 590-591
 Bahram VII
 Bahram Khan, 14th-century governor based in Bengal
 Dawlat Wazir Bahram Khan, 16th-century Bengali poet and Vizier of Chittagong
 Armenian king Gushnasp Vahram, r. 509/514-518
 Vahram Pahlavouni an Armenian army commander
 Bahram ibn Shahriyar, Bavandid prince
 Muiz ud din Bahram, the sixth sultan of Delhi
 Bahram Nouraei, Iranian Hip Hop Artist

Other
 Bahram (Shahnameh), a heroic character in Shahnameh, the national epic of Greater Iran
 Bahram (horse), the 1935 Triple Crown Champion of British Thoroughbred Racing
 Bahram, Iran (disambiguation)
 Bihram, a Mandaean celestial being and given name
 The Persian language name for the planet Mars

See also
 Bahram (name), a popular male Persian given name
 Vahram (disambiguation)